The Sir Peter Ustinov Television Scriptwriting Award is a prestigious television writing award bestowed annually by the International Academy of Television Arts and Sciences non-American novice writers under the age of 30.

The late Sir Peter Ustinov gave his name to the International Academy for its Foundation’s television scriptwriting award. The competition is designed to motivate novice writers worldwide, and offer them the recognition and encouragement that might lead to a successful career in television scriptwriting.

The successful screenwriter is presented with the award in November at the International Emmy Awards Gala in New York City. The award winner also receives US $2,500, is given a staged reading of their script by professional actors, and is offered the opportunity to work with an established writer as a mentor.

Sir Peter Ustinov Television Scriptwriting Award Winners 
2019 - Violet MacDonald (United Kingdom) The Wolf
2018 - Lexi Savoy (Canada) Who Killed Heather McAdams?
2017 - Joe Brukner (Australia) Judas
2016 - C.S. McMullen (Australia) Living Metal
2015 – Gabriel Bergmoser (Australia) Windmills
2014 – Caitlin D. Fryers (Canada) Fealty
2013 – Rosy Deacon (United Kingdom) Shards
2012 – Sophie Petzal (United Kingdom) Sanctioned
2011 – Robert Goldsbrough (United Kingdom) The Forge
2010 – Jason Spencer (Australia) Spirits of the Past
2009 – Claire Tonkin (Australia) Me and Mine
2008 – Jez Freedman (United Kingdom) The Storyteller
2007 – Felicity Carpenter (Australia) Touching People
2006 – Nimer Rashed (United Kingdom) The Great McGinty
2005 – John Allison (United Kingdom) Distant Relatives
2004 – Caroline Doherty (South Africa) Passion Gap
2003 – Jo Kasch  (Australia) Upstream
2002 – Howard Hunt (United Kingdom) Lie of the Land
2001 – Colm Maher (Ireland) True Story
2000 – Sylke Rene Meyer (Germany) Who is Anna Walentynowicz?
1999 – Glenn Weller (Australia) Beautiful Music
1997 – Tatyana Murzakova (Russia) Smile of the King

External links
Official site of the Sir Peter Ustinov Television Scriptwriting Award

International Emmy Awards
Screenwriting awards for television